Zulkifeli bin Mohd. Zin (born 14 June 1956) is the 18th and the former Chief of Defence Forces of Malaysia.

Education 
He was educated at Sultan Ismail College (SIC) in Kelantan. In 1974, upon completion of his cadet training in Sandhurst, he was first commissioned as a second lieutenant to the 2nd Royal Malay Regiment as a platoon commander on 9 August 1974.

He holds a Master of Science degree from the National Defense University.

He is also a graduate from the Malaysian Armed Forces Staff College (MTAT) and the Malaysian Armed Forces Defence College (MPAT). Both colleges have since been consolidated as one under the National Defense Studies Centre (Puspahanas).

Military career (1974–2016) 
Throughout his military career, he has held various positions ranging from platoon commander to commanding officer.

He also held staff positions in the Army Headquarters and Training Institute. This included stints as Staff Officer of the Army Headquarters as well as the Trick Trainer at the Army Training Centre of Johor Bahru. Between 1999 and 2000, he was the Infantry Director of the Army Headquarters.

During his rank of colonel, he was the commandant of Army Combat Training Centre (PULADA) and Resource Colonel in the Army Headquarters.

He was promoted to the rank of brigadier general in 2002 had been hold the office of assistant commander of Reserve Services Division. He also commanded 8th Infantry Brigade (8 Bgd) from 2003 to 2004 in Kelantan. He was then promoted as the rank of major general and was entrusted by the military high command to lead the International Monitoring Team Mission – Mindanao as the commander of the Monitoring Team between 9 October 2004 and 31 August 2005.

Then, he was the 3rd Infantry Division (3 Div) Commander from 17 October 2005 to 31 January 2007. He was the commander of Army Field Headquarters from 2 January 2007 to 1 June 2008.

As a dedicated leader, he was appointed deputy army commander on 2 June 2008 – serving until 20 May 2010 upon which he was appointed Chief of Army.

Due to high confidence in him, he was appointed as the 18th Chief of Defence Forces effective on 15 June 2011.

He retired on December 16, 2016.

Director General of National Security Council (2016–2018) 
He was appointed as the 1st Director General of National Security Council (NSC) on 15 August 2016, when he still holding the post of Chief of Defence Forces. He has been the first-ever with military background appointed to the seat. Before this, the title for NSC chief is 'Secretary General' and given only to Senior Civil Servant in Malaysian Government. He was replaced by Engku Hamzah Tuan Mat as director general of NSC beginning 1 September 2018.

Personal life 
He is married to Puan Sri Datin Seri Umi Kalsom Wan Awang and together were blessed with 2 daughters.

Honours

Honours of Malaysia
  :
  Officer of the Order of the Defender of the Realm (KMN) (2002)
  Companion of the Order of the Defender of the Realm (JMN) (2005)
  Commander of the Order of Meritorious Service (PJN) – Datuk (2008)
  Commander of the Order of Loyalty to the Crown of Malaysia (PSM) – Tan Sri (2011)
  Commander of the Order of the Defender of the Realm (PMN) – Tan Sri (2012)
  :
  Knight Commander of the Order of the Territorial Crown (PMW) – Datuk (2009)
  Grand Knight of the Order of the Territorial Crown (SUMW) – Datuk Seri Utama (2016)
  :
 Companion of the Order of Loyalty to the Royal House of Kedah (SDK) (2000)
  Knight Companion of the Order of Loyalty to the Royal House of Kedah (DSDK) – Dato' (2004)
  Knight Commander of the Order of the Crown of Kedah (DGMK) – Dato' Wira (2008)
  Knight Commander of the Order of Loyalty to Sultan Abdul Halim Mu'adzam Shah (DHMS) – Dato' Paduka (2011)
  Knight Grand Companion of the Order of Loyalty to the Royal House of Kedah (SSDK) – Dato' Seri (2012)
  :
  Knight Commander of the Order of the Noble Crown of Kelantan (DPKK) – Dato' (2004)
  Knight Grand Commander of the Order of the Crown of Kelantan (SPMK) – Dato' (2011)
  :
  Companion Class I of the Order of Malacca (DMSM) – Datuk (2006)
  Knight Commander of the Order of Malacca (DCSM) – Datuk Wira (2012)
  :
  Grand Knight of the Order of Loyalty to Tuanku Muhriz (SSTM) – Dato' Seri (2011)
  :
  Grand Knight of the Order of the Crown of Pahang (SIMP) – Dato' Indera (2008)
  Grand Knight of the Order of Sultan Ahmad Shah of Pahang (SSAP) – Dato' Sri (2010)
  :
  Knight Commander of the Order of the Defender of State (DPPN) – Dato' Seri (2011)
  :
  Knight Grand Commander of the Order of Taming Sari (SPTS) – Dato' Seri Panglima (2011)
  :
  Knight Grand Commander of the Order of the Crown of Perlis (SPMP) – Dato' Seri (2011)
  :
  Grand Commander of the Order of Kinabalu (SPDK) – Datuk Seri Panglima (2013)
  :
  Knight Commander of the Order of the Star of Sarawak (PNBS) – Dato Sri (2015)
  :
  Knight Grand Commander of the Order of the Crown of Selangor (SPMS) – Dato' Seri (2012)
  :
  Knight Grand Commander of the Order of the Crown of Terengganu (SPMT) – Dato' (2012)

International honours
 :
  Commander of the Philippine Legion of Honour (CLH) (2005)
 :
 Star of Yudha Dharma,1st Class (2012)
 Star of Kartika Eka Paksi, 1st Class (2012)
  :
 Darjah Utama Bakti Cemerlang (Tentera) (DUBC) (2014)
 :
 Knight Grand Cross of the Order of the Crown of Thailand (2014)
 :
 The Most Exalted Order of Famous Valour 1st Class (DPKT) (2012)

References

External links 

1956 births
Living people
People from Kelantan
Malaysian people of Malay descent
Malaysian Muslims
Malaysian military personnel
Knights Commander of the Most Exalted Order of the Star of Sarawak
Officers of the Order of the Defender of the Realm
Companions of the Order of the Defender of the Realm
Commanders of the Order of Meritorious Service
Grand Commanders of the Order of Kinabalu
Commanders of the Order of Loyalty to the Crown of Malaysia
Commanders of the Order of the Defender of the Realm
21st-century Malaysian people
Knights Grand Commander of the Order of the Crown of Terengganu
Knights Grand Commander of the Order of the Crown of Selangor